Andrés Alcántara Prieto  (born 24 March 1991), commonly known as Andresito, is a Spanish futsal player who plays for Nagoya Oceans as a Wing.

External links
LNFS profile
UEFA profile

1991 births
Living people
Spanish men's futsal players
Ribera Navarra FS players
Sportspeople from Córdoba, Spain